Fareghan District is a district (bakhsh) in Hajjiabad County, Hormozgan Province, Iran. At the 2006 census, its population was 13,024, in 3,270 families.  The District has one city: Fareghan. The District has two rural districts (dehestan): Ashkara Rural District and Fareghan Rural District.

References 

Districts of Hormozgan Province
Hajjiabad County